Anthony Boone is an American college basketball coach and former player. He is the head coach of the Central Arkansas Bears men's basketball team.

Playing career
Boone played college basketball at Ole Miss, where he was a 1995 SEC All-Rookie selection. His career was hampered by injuries, but during his senior season he was nominated for the Chip Hilton Player of the Year Award, and was inducted into the Ole Miss Hall of Fame as well as having his number 41 jersey retired. At the time, Boone's jersey joined Archie Manning as the only two jerseys retired in Ole Miss history.

Coaching career
After graduation, Boone stayed on with Ole Miss under Rod Barnes as a graduate assistant before moving on to Murray State as an assistant coach under Tevester Anderson for three seasons. He'd follow Anderson to Jackson State and stay for six seasons until joining the staff of Grand Canyon, then an NCAA Division II under his former Ole Miss assistant Russ Pennell. After the 2014 season, Boone would follow Pennell again as he became head coach of the WNBA's Phoenix Mercury for a short spell in 2013.

When Pennell landed the Central Arkansas job, Boone joined him once more as an assistant coach. After a 1–8 start to the 2019–20 season, Pennell took a leave of absence in December 2019 and eventually resigned in January 2020, with Boone taking over on an interim basis. After guiding the Bears to a 9–13 record the remainder of the season, he was named the permanent head coach on March 9, 2020.

Head coaching record

References

1976 births
Living people
American men's basketball coaches
American women's basketball coaches
Basketball coaches from Arkansas
Basketball players from Arkansas
Central Arkansas Bears basketball coaches
College men's basketball head coaches in the United States
Grand Canyon Antelopes men's basketball coaches
Jackson State Tigers basketball coaches
Murray State Racers men's basketball coaches
Ole Miss Rebels men's basketball coaches
Ole Miss Rebels men's basketball players
People from West Helena, Arkansas
Phoenix Mercury coaches